Hocine Gacemi (26 March 1974 – 21 March 2000) was an Algerian footballer. He was born in Alger, Algeria.

Career
Gacemi started his career with home-town club MC Alger. One of the most promising young strikers in the Algerian league, Gacemi signed with JS Kabylie at the beginning of the 1999 campaign. He was being linked with a move to Ligue 1 club RC Lens before he died.

Death
On 19 March 2000, in a league match between JS Kabylie and USM Annaba, in Tizi-Ouzou. Gacemi scored a goal with his head from a cross passed by teammate Fawzi Moussouni, but he hit his head violently on USM Annaba Defender Yacine Slatni, before collapsing to the ground and was knocked unconscious. He was immediately transferred to a local hospital and then to Pitié-Salpêtrière Hospital in Paris, France, where he died from his injuries two days later.

References

External links
 L’Algérie pleure son champion: Hocine Gacemi est mort 

1974 births
Algerian footballers
2000 deaths
JS Kabylie players
Footballers from Algiers
Sport deaths in France
Association football players who died while playing
MC Alger players
Association footballers not categorized by position